"4 AM" is a song by Canadian R&B singer Melanie Fiona from her second studio album, The MF Life (2012). It is the second single taken from the album released on September 6, 2011.

Music video
A music video to accompany the release of "4 AM" was first released onto YouTube on October 5, 2011.

Track listing

Charts

Weekly charts

Year-end charts

Certifications

6 AM
"6 AM" was the official remix featuring T-Pain, peaking at No. 73 on the Billboard R&B/Hip-Hop chart.

Weekly charts

References

2011 songs
2011 singles
Melanie Fiona songs
Contemporary R&B ballads
Soul ballads
Songs written by Rico Love
Music videos directed by Colin Tilley
SRC Records singles
2010s ballads